Magali Clément was a French director, screenwriter and actress.

Theatre

Filmography

References

External links
 

2008 deaths
French film directors
French women film directors
French women screenwriters
20th-century French screenwriters
20th-century French actresses
20th-century French women writers